This is a list of ski areas and resorts in Nepal. 

 Api Base
 Dhorpatan Park
 Everest Base
 Gaurisankhar Base
 Jugal Base
 Kanchjunga Base
 Khaptad Region
 Lhotse Base
 Manaslu Base
 Nuptse Base
 Saipal Base
 Many glaciers of the country 

Nepal
ski areas